Patti Smith: Dream of Life is a 2008 documentary film about Patti Smith directed by Steven Sebring. It was presented at Berlin International Film Festival. The movie won the "Excellence in Cinematography Award: Documentary" at the 2008 Sundance Film Festival and aired on the PBS series P.O.V. on December 30, 2009.

A Patti Smith: Dream of Life app for the iPad was published in May 2011.

Band 
 Patti Smith – vocals, clarinet
 Lenny Kaye – guitar
 Oliver Ray – guitar
 Tony Shanahan – bass, vocals
 Jay Dee Daugherty – drums

Notes

External links 
 
 
 

2008 films
American documentary films
Documentary films about singers
Documentary films about women writers
American independent films
American nonlinear narrative films
Sundance Film Festival award winners
Patti Smith
2008 documentary films
Documentary films about women in music
2008 directorial debut films
2008 independent films
2000s English-language films
2000s American films